Francisco Raggio (born May 27, 2002) is an American soccer player who plays as a midfielder.

Career

Fort Lauderdale CF
Raggio made his league debut for the club on 18 July 2020, registering 63 minutes before being replaced by Joshua Saavedra in a 2-0 defeat to the Greenville Triumph.

References

External link
Francisco Raggio at US Soccer Development Academy

2002 births
Living people
Inter Miami CF II players
USL League One players
American soccer players
Association football midfielders
Sportspeople from Miami Beach, Florida
Soccer players from Florida